"The Bridge" is a song from English musician Elton John's 2006 album The Captain & the Kid. It is a simple, stripped-down production focused on John and his piano, with sparse further accompaniment. This is the first song since the title track of Breaking Hearts with this arrangement. The song, which was only released as a promotional single, peaked at No. 19 on Billboard's Hot Adult Contemporary Tracks.

Synopsis
Before playing the song at a concert in Atlantic City, New Jersey on 7 October 2006, John introduced it as a song that can "apply to anyone" at any time in their lives and having to move on instead of living in the past. They either cross the bridge, die trying, or fade away.

Charts

Weekly charts

Year-end charts

Musical development
The song is in the key of D and in  time.
There is also a part of the song which breaks from the usual pattern of both the verse of chorus. In a song, this is typically called a bridge or interlude.
The instrumental features John and his piano, accompanied by some haunting harmonies, performed by the rest of the band members. John wanted the sound to be childlike and so the original recording of the harmonies has been adjusted.
John has admitted that it was, in fact, Taupin's idea to have the song solely piano and voice. This was the first song since Breaking Hearts (Ain't What It Used to Be) to use John's piano only.

References

Elton John songs
Songs with music by Elton John
Songs with lyrics by Bernie Taupin
2006 songs